Sarah Garland Boyd Jones (née Sarah Garland Boyd; 1866May 11, 1905) was an American physician from the U.S. state of Virginia. She was the first woman to receive a certificate from the Virginia State Medical Examining Board, and with her husband, co-founded a hospital in Richmond, Virginia.

Biography
Sarah Garland Boyd was born in Albemarle County, Virginia. She was the daughter of George W. Boyd, the leading African American contractor and builder of Richmond, Virginia, remembered for the Maggie L. Walker house; and Ellen Boyd. She was educated in the public schools of Richmond, and after graduating in 1883 from Richmond Colored Normal School with Maggie L. Walker, she taught in the Richmond schools for five years.

In 1888, she married Miles Berkley Jones, who, at that time, was also a teacher, and later, G. W. A. Secretary of the True Reformers. From 1890 to 1893, Jones attended Howard University Medical College, sessions 23 to 25, and graduated as a medical doctor in 1893. She passed the Virginia State Medical Examining Board, receiving over 90 per cent on the examination in surgery. Jones was the first woman to receive a certificate from the board. Thereafter, she practiced medicine in Richmond. With her husband, who also became a physician, she opened Richmond Hospital, which was also known as the Women's Central Hospital.

Personal life
Jones died May 11, 1905. Her sister, who also became a physician, married her brother-in-law, the widower, Miles Berkley Jones, The Sarah G. Jones Memorial Hospital, Medical College and Training School for Nurses was named in her honor in 1922.

References

External links

Attribution

Bibliography

1866 births
1905 deaths
People from Albemarle County, Virginia
African-American physicians
Physicians from Virginia
Howard University alumni
People from Richmond, Virginia
19th-century American women physicians
19th-century American physicians
20th-century African-American people
20th-century African-American women